The 2018 New York Attorney General election took place on November 6, 2018. New York City Public Advocate Letitia James, a Democrat, was elected. James is the first woman and the first African-American to be elected New York Attorney General.

Former attorney general Eric Schneiderman resigned on May 8, 2018, after allegations of domestic abuse and withdrew from his then-ongoing reelection campaign. Incumbent solicitor general Barbara Underwood was chosen by the legislature to complete her unexpired term, but opted not to seek election to a full term.

On September 13, 2018, James won the Democratic nomination for attorney general, defeating Leecia Eve, former senior policy advisor to U.S. Senator Hillary Clinton; Sean Patrick Maloney, U.S. Representative for New York's 18th congressional district; and Zephyr Teachout, professor at Fordham University School of Law. In the general election, James defeated Republican Party candidate Keith Wofford with over 60% of the vote.

In the general election, James carried every county won by Andrew Cuomo in the concurrent gubernatorial election as well as Franklin, Clinton, Essex, Orange, Duchess, Columbia, Broome, Cortland and Schenectady counties. As of 2021, this along with the concurrent comptroller election and senate election is the last time Franklin, Cortland and Orange counties have voted Democratic.

Background
Attorney General Eric Schneiderman, a Democrat, was first elected to the office of Attorney General in 2010, winning reelection in 2014. He was in the midst of campaigning for a third term in office when on May 7, 2018, The New Yorker revealed allegations that he had physically abused several women he had dated during his tenure in office. Schneiderman resigned hours after the story was released, with the resignation taking effect at the end of the business day May 8; he did not seek re-election.

Barbara Underwood, the solicitor general, took on the duties of Attorney General upon Schneiderman's resignation. A joint session of the New York State Legislature formally appointed Underwood to fill the rest of Schneiderman's term on May 22, after interviewing several potential candidates; of the 209 members in the State Legislature, 190 votes were cast in favor, with one (Charles Barron) voting against her in protest of the process, and 18 abstaining. Underwood has confirmed that she will not run for the office in the 2018 elections and returned to her previous position as solicitor general following the election.

Democratic primary

Candidates

Filed
The following candidates were certified by the State Board of Elections as having filed for the primary ballot (James by state convention nomination and the others by submitting sufficient signatures):
Leecia Eve, former senior policy advisor to U.S. Senator Hillary Clinton, candidate for Lieutenant Governor of New York in 2006
Letitia James, New York City Public Advocate (nominee of the state party convention)
Sean Patrick Maloney, U.S. Representative for New York's 18th congressional district
Zephyr Teachout, Fordham Law Associate Professor, nominee for the U.S. House of Representatives in New York's 19th congressional district in 2016, candidate for Governor of New York in 2014

Withdrew
Eric Schneiderman, former attorney general

Declined
Daniel Garodnick, former member of the New York City Council
Michael Gianaris, New York State Senator
Kathleen Rice, U.S. Representative from New York's 4th congressional district
Barbara Underwood, interim Attorney General
Tim Wu, special enforcement counsel to the attorney general and 2014 lieutenant governor primary candidate
Charles D. Lavine, Member of the New York State Assembly

Endorsements

Polling

Results

Turnout: 28.08%

Republican primary

Candidates

Nominee
Keith Wofford, co-managing partner of Ropes & Gray's New York City office (designated party nominee)

Wofford grew up in Buffalo, New York and attended Harvard College on scholarship.

Withdrew
Manny Alicandro, corporate attorney from Manhattan (ended Attorney General campaign in May 2018 to run for Comptroller)
Joe Holland, former Commissioner of the New York Department of Housing and Community Renewal (defeated for Republican nomination; endorsed Republican nominee Keith Wofford)

Declined
John P. Cahill, Republican nominee for attorney general in 2014 and former aide to Governor George Pataki
 John Katko, U.S. Representative
 John DeFrancisco, Deputy Majority Leader of the New York State Senate

Endorsements

Qualified third parties

Conservative
Conservative Party of New York State chairman Michael R. Long indicated the party would cross-endorse the Republican nominee for attorney general.

Nominee: Keith Wofford

Working Families
Nominee: Letitia James. The party endorsed both Letitia James and Zephyr Teachout prior to the September 13 primary election. Kenneth Schaefer, who was nominated as the Working Families Party's dummy candidate, withdrew by October 9 in favor of Democratic nominee Letitia James.

Independence Party
Nominee: Letitia James. Victor J. Messina, Jr., the original nominee, withdrew by October 9 as well.

Green Party
Nominee: Michael Sussman

Reform
On May 20, 2018, the Reform Party of New York State authorized four candidates to run for attorney general in its September 13, 2018 primary:

Preet Bharara, former U.S. Attorney (declined)
Michael Diederich, Jr.
Christopher B. Garvey, Libertarian Party nominee and perennial candidate
Nancy Regula, animal rights activist and wife of party chairman Curtis Sliwa

Results

Other third parties

Libertarian
Christopher B. Garvey

General election

Polling

Results
Letitia James (D) went on to easily win the election, with 62% of the vote versus Wofford's (R) 35%. James became the first woman and the first African-American to be elected New York Attorney General.

References

External links
New York Attorney General election, 2018 at Ballotpedia

Official campaign websites
Letitia James (D) for Attorney General
Keith Wofford (R) for Attorney General
Christopher Garvey (L, REF) for Attorney General

Attorney General
New York Attorney General elections
New York